Gusti Bagus Djilantik (1887-1966) was the raja of Karangasem Regency in Bali. He served under Dutch East Indies colonial rule. He built the Taman Ujung temple garden. He had the title Anak Agung Agung Anglurah K’tut Karangasem. The park was 400 hectares but was reduced by land reform programs to 10 hectares.

Gallery

See also
Dutch intervention in Lombok and Karangasem
Bulantrisna Djelantik, one of his granddaughters

References

1887 births
1966 deaths
History of Bali
Indonesian royalty
Date of birth missing
Place of birth missing
Date of death missing
Place of death missing
People of the Dutch East Indies